Anastasiia Vladislavovna Gontar (born 11 May 2001) is a Russian para swimmer. She won gold in the 2020 Summer Paralympics.

Early life
Anastasiia Gontar was born in Surgut. Her mother, a Master of Sports in swimming, brought her to the pool after Anastasiia tried singing and gymnastics. She started swimming at the age of five in the sports school Olimp. When she was 10 years old her parents detected a curvature of her spine, and two years later she was diagnosed with an idiopathic 2nd grade scoliosis. After several months the disease progressed to a 4th, critical grade in which she developed a hump, which she hid wearing clothes two or three sizes larger than her size. The curved spine pressed her right lung and her kidney, which led to breathing difficulties; twenty minutes walking gave her severe back pain.

Gontar's parents tried numerous kinds of therapy for her. They pursued physiotherapy, electrophoresis, manual and laser therapy, hydro massage, putting her in a corset, and even consulted quacks and witch doctors in the hope to heal her. She finally underwent surgery in a children's hospital in Moscow. The doctors corrected her spine, mounting two plates and 18 screws. After years she still feels pain in her neck, head, rump and feet, but she is able to swim, among other activities. Apart from swimming, Gontar regularly attends classical massage, medical gymnastics, acupuncture and vacuum massage sessions.

In 2016 she won six medals at the National Paralympics Championships in Bashkortostan, and a year later she entered the national Paralympic team.

Personal life
Gontar studies in the medical institute of the Surgut State University, and plans to become a physician. Her first and current coach is Sergey Nikolayevich Gramatikopolo, who was the only one in the sports school who agreed to coach Gontar after surgery. About eighteen months after the surgery, she was sent to the Adaptive Sports Center in Surgut, where she was coached by adaptive sports specialist Natalia Afanevich.

References 

2001 births
Living people
Paralympic swimmers of Russia
Swimmers at the 2020 Summer Paralympics
Medalists at the 2020 Summer Paralympics
Paralympic gold medalists for the Russian Paralympic Committee athletes
Paralympic silver medalists for the Russian Paralympic Committee athletes
Russian female freestyle swimmers
S9-classified Paralympic swimmers
Sportspeople from Surgut
21st-century Russian women